BYX may refer to:

 A stock exchange;  see 
 ΒΥΧ, Greek letters of the American Christian social fraternity Beta Upsilon Chi